In 1922 the Deutsche Reichsbahn began to develop a renumbering plan to standardize the numbering of steam locomotives that had been taken over from the state railways (Länderbahnen). Its basis was the corresponding DRG classification system.

The first renumbering plan in 1922 envisaged more class numbers than the later plans. The development of this scheme was discontinued because it was seen that there would be problems in practically adopting it.

The second, provisional, renumbering plan of 25 July 1923 was very like the final version of 1925 in its basic structure. It incorporated space for the new standard locomotives (Einheitslokomotiven) that were planned. The third and final renumbering plan of 1925 differed from its predecessor primarily in that all the locomotives retired up to that point – in some cases entire classes – were deleted; in addition several mistakes in the numbering were corrected.

With the exception of Bavarian classes, new locomotives built after 1923 were delivered from the outset with their new operating numbers. The actual renumbering of older engines did not begin until 1926.

Locomotives that were seen as obsolete and which would therefore soon be retired, were given serial numbers from 7001 after their class number.

Express train locomotives

Passenger train locomotives

Goods train locomotives

Passenger train tank locomotives

Goods train tank locomotives

Cog locomotives

Branch line locomotives

Narrow gauge locomotives

1000 mm Gauge

900 mm Gauge

785 mm Gauge

750 mm Gauge

Literature 

 Helmut Griebl, Fr. Schadow: Verzeichnis der deutschen Lokomotiven 1923 - 1965; Transpress VEB Verlag für Verkehrswesen Berlin, Verlag Josef Otto Slezak Wien 1967
 Valtin, Wolfgang: Verzeichnis aller Lokomotiven und Triebwagen - Band 2; Transpress Verlagsgesellschaft mbH Berlin 1992; 
 Herbert Rauter, Dr. Günter Scheingraber, Manfred Weisbrod: Preußen-Report, Bände 3 - 8; Herrmann Merker Verlag Fürstenfeldbruck 1991 - 1994

See also 
History of rail transport in Germany
Deutsche Reichsbahn
Deutsche Reichsbahn-Gesellschaft
UIC classification

Deutsche Reichsbahn-Gesellschaft locomotives
Steam locomotives of Germany
Locomotive classification systems
German railway-related lists